Kanazawa Umimirai Library is a public library located in Kanazawa city, Ishikawa Prefecture, Japan. This is a contemporary building by the Japanese architects Kazumi Kudo and Hiroshi Horiba, completed in 2011.
Its surface creates a decorative grid made of some 6000 small circular blocks of glass which puncture the concrete surface of the building in a triangular array.

Building

The firm that designed the library, Coelacanth K&H, describe the building as a "simple space" of 45m by 45m and 12m high. It was completed in March 2011. The floor area is 5,641.9 square metres; the building's area is 2,311.9 square metres. The "single quiet and tranquil room ... resembles a forest, filled with soft light and a feeling of openness reminiscent of the outdoors".

Prize
Hiroshi Horiba and Kazumi Kudo won a Japan Institute of Architects Prize for the library in 2013.

Gallery

See also
 Mathematics and architecture

References

Architecture in Japan
Libraries in Japan
Library buildings completed in 2011
Libraries established in 2011